The canton of Rousson is an administrative division of the Gard department, southern France. It was created at the French canton reorganisation which came into effect in March 2015. Its seat is in Rousson.

Composition

It consists of the following communes:
 
Allègre-les-Fumades
Barjac
Bessèges
Bordezac
Courry
Gagnières
Les Mages
Le Martinet
Méjannes-le-Clap
Meyrannes
Molières-sur-Cèze
Navacelles
Peyremale
Potelières
Rivières
Robiac-Rochessadoule
Rochegude
Rousson
Saint-Ambroix
Saint-Brès
Saint-Denis
Saint-Florent-sur-Auzonnet
Saint-Jean-de-Maruéjols-et-Avéjan
Saint-Jean-de-Valériscle
Saint-Julien-de-Cassagnas
Saint-Julien-les-Rosiers
Saint-Privat-de-Champclos
Saint-Victor-de-Malcap
Tharaux

Councillors

Pictures of the canton

References

Cantons of Gard